The 2016–17 Montenegrin Cup was the 11th season of the Montenegrin knockout football tournament. The winner of the tournament received a berth in the first qualifying round of the 2017–18 UEFA Europa League. The defending champions were Rudar, who beat Budućnost in the final of the last competition. The competition featured 30 teams. It started on 20 September 2016 and ended with the final on 31 May 2017.

Participants
Like during the past seasons, in Montenegrin Cup 2016-17 were participated 30 clubs. Among them are 12 members of Montenegrin First League, 12 members of Montenegrin Second League and 6 teams from Montenegrin Third League - who were winners and runners-up of Montenegrin Regional Cups (North, Central, South) for season 2016.
Finalists of  2015–16 Montenegrin Cup (Rudar and Budućnost are starting competition from Round of 16, while all the other clubs are playing from the first round of competition.

First round
Fourteen first round matches were played on 20 and 21 September 2016.

Summary

|}

Matches

Source:

Second round
Sixteen clubs competed in the second round played over two legs on 28 September and 26 October 2016.

Summary

|}

First legs

Second legs

Quarter-finals
Eight clubs competed in the quarter-finals played over two legs on 2 and 30 November 2016.

Summary

|}

First legs

Second legs

Semi-finals
Four clubs competed in the semi-finals played over two legs on 12 and 26 April 2017.

Summary

|}

First legs

Second legs

Final

See also
Montenegrin Cup
Montenegrin Regional Cups
Montenegrin First League

References

External links
Montenegrin Cup 2016-2017 at Football Association of Montenegro's official site
Montenegrin Cup 2016-2017 at Soccerway

Montenegrin Cup seasons
Cup
Montenegro